The 1999–2000 season saw Associazione Sportiva Roma continue its long drought of titles, finishing a frustrating 6th place in Serie A.

New manager Fabio Capello did not make an immediate impact, and its position actually worsened with one spot, despite 18 goals from Sampdoria signing Vincenzo Montella. Reward for Capello's new 3–4–1–2 system would come in 2000–01, however, when summer signings Gabriel Batistuta, Walter Samuel and Emerson completed the thin squad of the 1999–2000 season, and Roma was able to claim the title. That seemed far away as city rivals Lazio celebrated the 2000 league title.

Players

Squad information

Transfers

Competitions

Overall

Last updated: 14 May 2000

Serie A

League table

Results summary

Results by round

Matches

Coppa Italia

Round of 16

Quarter-finals

UEFA Cup

First round

Second round

Third round

Round of 16

Statistics

Players statistics

Goalscorers
  Vincenzo Montella 18 (4)
  Marco Delvecchio 11
  Francesco Totti 7 (4)
  Vincent Candela 3

References

A.S. Roma seasons
Roma